William Foster (12 January 1887 – 2 December 1947) was a British Labour Party politician.

He was elected to the House of Commons as Member of Parliament (MP) for Wigan in a by-election in 1942, following the death of sitting Labour MP John Parkinson.

Foster was re-elected at the 1945 general election, but  died aged 60 in 1947, before completing his first full term in parliament. In the subsequent by-election in 1948, the seat was held for Labour by Ronald Williams.

References

External links 
 

1887 births
1947 deaths
Labour Party (UK) MPs for English constituencies
Miners' Federation of Great Britain-sponsored MPs
National Union of Mineworkers-sponsored MPs
UK MPs 1935–1945
UK MPs 1945–1950
Members of the Parliament of the United Kingdom for Wigan
Ministers in the Attlee governments, 1945–1951